Roy Thomson Hall is a concert hall in Toronto, Ontario, Canada. Located downtown in the city's entertainment district, it is home to the Toronto Symphony Orchestra, the Toronto Mendelssohn Choir, and the Toronto Defiant. Opened in 1982, its circular architectural design exhibits a sloping and curvilinear glass exterior. It was designed by Canadian architects Arthur Erickson and Mathers and Haldenby. Itzhak Perlman acted as a special advisor to the architects on accessibility needs for disabled performers and guests.

The hall seats 2,630 guests and features a pipe organ built by Canadian organ builder Gabriel Kney from London, Ontario.

The hall was formerly known as The New Massey Hall during its construction and pre-construction phase. It acquired its official name on January 14, 1982, as thanks to the family of Roy Thomson (first Lord Thomson of Fleet and founder of the publishing empire Thomson Corporation), who had donated C$4.5 million to complete the fundraising efforts for the new hall.

The hall was renovated over a period of six months in 2002, after years of complaints from musicians about the quality of its acoustics.

Filmmaker Jeffery Klassen's 2005 film, Toronto Architecture, interviews Arthur Erickson about the structure. Erickson talks of the point of the grey structure being that of a container which people were to fill up with their own decorations. The pond was originally designed to be used as a skating rink in the winter. The building was influenced by Erickson's journeys in Japan and his relationship with the North American Aboriginals.

The hall is one of the main venues used by the Toronto International Film Festival, with many gala screenings held there each year including a festival-closing screening of the year's People's Choice Award winner. The concert hall was used in scenes of the 2000 film X-Men. The science fiction television series The Expanse use it as the setting for the United Nations headquarters. The Amazon series The Boys also uses the hall as the bottom base for the otherwise digitally created superheroes’ tower Vought Headquarters.

The hall was the venue of the state funeral of federal Leader of the Official Opposition and NDP leader Jack Layton on August 27, 2011.

See also
Other performing arts venues in the city include:

 Four Seasons Centre
 Massey Hall
 Budweiser Stage
 Meridian Hall (Toronto)
 Toronto Centre for the Arts

References

External links

 

Arthur Erickson buildings
Modernist architecture in Canada
Concert halls in Canada
Music venues in Toronto
Thomson family
PATH (Toronto)
Music venues completed in 1982
1982 establishments in Ontario
Toronto Defiant
Esports venues in Canada